New Incentives is a non-governmental organization (NGO) that operates in Nigeria, running a conditional cash transfer (CCT) program. They aim to increase infantile vaccination through cash transfers, raising public awareness and reducing the frequency of vaccine stockout.

In Nigeria, New Incentives is known as the All Babies Are Equal (ABAE) Initiative, due to the name New Incentives not being accepted for registration. The organization is sometimes referred to as NI-ABAE. In November 2020 the charity evaluator GiveWell listed New Incentives as one of its top nine charities.

History 
New Incentives was founded in 2011 by Patrick Stadler, Pratyush Agarwal, and Svetha Janumpalli. HIV prevention was originally at the heart of their strategy. Women could receive cash transfers upon registration of their pregnancy, HIV testing and birth delivery at hospital. Other at risk-pregnancies were later included, such as anemia, hepatitis and tuberculosis.

New incentives now focuses on immunisation of under-five children.

Operations 
The New Incentives CCT program is run in North West Nigeria in the states of Jigawa, Katsina and Zamfara. This region has one of the lowest vaccination coverages in the world, less than 25% of the infants are vaccinated.

As of february 2021 Nigeria has an under-five mortality rate of 117.2 per 1000 live births, the highest in the world. Of these children about 40% died from vaccine-preventable diseases like pneumonia, diarrhea and measles.

The under five child mortality rate differs from state to state, with Kebbi having the highest (252 deaths per 1000), Ogun having the lowest (30 deaths per 1000), and the North West region having the highest regional rate at 187 deaths per 1000 according to the Nigeria Demographic and Health survey from 2018.

The cash transfers from New Incentives are conditioned by the vaccination of infants with the BCG vaccine, the pentavalent vaccine, the pneumococcal conjugate vaccine and the meningococcal vaccine, which immunize them against tuberculosis, measles, pneumococcal infection and hepatitis B, among others.

Other activities include improving the supply chain of vaccines and vaccine information campaigns.

Effectiveness 
A randomized control trial conducted by IDInsight between July 2017 and February 2020 in North West Nigeria showed that children in NI-ABAE areas were 27% more likely to be fully vaccinated.

In a paper published in 2005 aiming to determine the most cost effective child health interventions in sub-Saharan Africa, immunization was deemed one of the most effective interventions, after micronutrient supplementation.  

In November 2020 the charity evaluator GiveWell listed New Incentives as one of its top nine charities. This evaluation was partly based on the randomized control trial conducted by IDInsight as well as on what they perceive to be the program’s cost-effectiveness, transparency and room for growth. However, some weaknesses were still underlined by GiveWell, regarding the early stage of development and potential governmental opposition.

References 

Non-governmental organizations
Vaccination-related organizations